The 2019 Delta State House of Assembly election was held on March 9, 2019, to elect members of the Delta State House of Assembly in Nigeria. All the 29 seats were up for election in the Delta State House of Assembly.

Sheriff Oborevwori from PDP representing Okpe constituency was elected Speaker, while Ochor Christopher Ochor from PDP representing Ukwuani North constituency was elected Deputy Speaker.

Results 
The result of the election is listed below.

 Sheriff Oborevwori from PDP won Okpe constituency
 Kenneth Ogba from PDP won Isoko South I constituency
 Ferguson Onwo from PDP won Isoko South II constituency
 Tim Owhefere from PDP won Isoko North constituency
 Friday Osanebi from PDP won Ndokwa East constituency
 Charles Emetulu from PDP won Ndokwa West constituency
 Rueben Izeze from PDP won Ughelli South constituency
 Pat Ajudua from PDP won Oshimili North constituency
 Shedrack Rapu from PDP won Oshimili South constituency
 Festus Okoh from PDP won Ika South constituency
 Anthony Elekeokwuri from PDP won Ika North East constituency
 Emmanuel Sinebe from PDP won Patani constituency
 Solomon Ighrakpata from PDP won Uvwie constituency
 Peter Uviejitobor from PDP won Udu constituency
 Felix Anirah from PDP won Sapele constituency
 Emeke Nwaobi from PDP won Aniocha North constituency
 Austin Chikezie from PDP won Aniocha South constituency
 Oboro Preyor from PDP won Bomadi constituency
 Asupa Forteta from PDP won Burutu I constituency
 Pullah Ekpotuayerin from PDP won Burutu II constituency
 Anidi Innocent from APC won Ethiope East constituency
 Erhiatake Ibori-Suonu from PDP won Ethiope West constituency
 Oniyere Charles from APC won Ughelli North I constituency
 Egbo Jaro from APC won Ughelli North II constituency
 Guwor Emomotimi from PDP won Warri South West constituency
 Alfred Martins from PDP won Warri North constituency
 Augustine Uroye from PDP won Warri South I constituency
 Matthew Opuoru from PDP won Warri South II constituency
 Ochor Christopher Ochor from PDP won Ukwuani constituency

References 

Delta State
House of Assembly